Stephen Smith (14 January 1874 – 19 May 1935) was an England international football player in the late 19th century.

Playing career
Smith was born in Abbots Bromley, Staffordshire. He played for Aston Villa from 1893 to 1901, helping them to win the Football League title in 1893–94, 1895–96, 1896–97, 1898–99 and 1899–1900, as well as the 1895 FA Cup Final. Although Villa also won the cup in 1897 (thereby taking the "double"), Smith was not selected to play in the final although he made four appearances in the earlier rounds. He made one England appearance against Scotland in 1895.

In 1901 he moved south to join Southern League club Portsmouth, helping them to regain the Southern League championship at the end of his first season.

Management career 
In 1906 he was appointed to the role of player-manager of another Southern League club, New Brompton, a position he held until 1908.

Quotes

The Villa News and Record, 1 Sept. 1906

Honours
Aston Villa
Football League champions:  1893–94, 1895–96, 1896–97, 1898–99, 1899–1900
FA Cup winners: 1895

References

External links

Steve Smith's Bio at Aston Villa Player Database

1874 births
1935 deaths
People from Abbots Bromley
English footballers
England international footballers
Association football outside forwards
Cannock Town F.C. players
Hednesford Town F.C. players
Aston Villa F.C. players
Portsmouth F.C. players
Gillingham F.C. players
English Football League players
English Football League representative players
English football managers
Gillingham F.C. managers
FA Cup Final players